Thekchok Dorje (1798–1868), also Thegchog Dorje, was the fourteenth Gyalwa Karmapa, head of the Kagyu School of Tibetan Buddhism.

Thekchok Dorje was born in Danang, Kham and was recognized because Drukchen Kunzig Chokyi Nangwa received a letter from Dudul Dorje, the thirteenth Karmapa, detailing where his next reincarnation would be born. He was ordained at the age of nineteen as a monk.

Thekchok Dorje traveled extensively through Tibet and was very active in the Rimé movement, which was an attempt to bring all the Tibetan schools together and find common grounds without attempting to equalize the different schools. He was especially interested in the exchange of knowledge between his own Kagyu school and the different Nyingma schools. Thekchok other interests were with poetry, sculpturing and dialectic.

His direct successor is not counted, because he died at the age of three. The Gelugpa school, on the other hand, does count children who are too young to receive transmissions.

External links
 "THE FOURTEENTH GYALWA KARMAPA, Thegchog Dorje".

Further reading
 

1798 births
1868 deaths
14
19th-century lamas
18th-century Tibetan people
19th-century Tibetan people